Mualang is an Ibanic Dayak language of Borneo. It is mostly spoken by the Dayak Mualang in parts of the Sekadau Regency and Sintang Regency in Indonesia.

References

Further reading

 

Ibanic languages
Languages of Indonesia
Agglutinative languages